The Coupe de France's results of the 1992–93 season. Paris SG won the final played on 12 June 1993, beating FC Nantes Atlantique.

Round of 64

Round of 32

Round of 16

Quarter-finals

Semi-finals

Final

References

1992–93 Coupe de France at ScoreShelf.com

1992–93 domestic association football cups
1992–93 in French football
1992-93